Garra cyrano is a species of ray-finned fish in the genus Garra from tributaries of the Mekong in Laos.

References 

Garra
Fish described in 2000